Colias occidentalis, the western sulphur or golden sulphur, is a butterfly in the family Pieridae found in North America. Its range includes the Pacific Northwest and parts of British Columbia.

Flight period is from late May until early July. Its habitats include ocean bluffs, forest openings, mountain slopes, and subalpine meadows.

Larvae feed on Vicia spp., Lupinus spp., Lathyrus spp., and Thermopsis spp.

Subspecies
Listed alphabetically.
C. o. chrysomelas H. Edwards, 1877 (California, Oregon)
C. o. occidentalis (British Columbia, Washington, Oregon)
C. o. sullivani Hammond & McCorkle, 2003 (Oregon)

References

External links

Colias occidentalis images at Consortium for the Barcode of Life

occidentalis
Butterflies of North America
Butterflies described in 1862